The Kid is a 2010 British biographical drama film directed by Nick Moran and co-written by Moran and Kevin Lewis. The film, based on Kevin Lewis' autobiography of the same name, details Lewis' adolescent and young adult life, having been raised in a violent, abusive family on a small council estate called New Addington in the 1980s.

Scottish singer/songwriter KT Tunstall wrote the song 'Boy' for the movie

Plot
Based on the real-life story of Kevin Lewis, the film follows his childhood of abuse, his descent into a life of crime and how he put his life together again afterwards. The screenplay was written by Mark Thomas and Kevin Lewis with additional writing by the film's director Nick Moran.

Cast
 Rupert Friend as Kevin Lewis
 Augustus Prew as teenage Kevin Lewis
 Ioan Gruffudd as Colin Smith
 Natascha McElhone as Gloria
 Con O'Neill as Dennis
 Bernard Hill as Uncle David
 Jodie Whittaker as Jackie
 David O'Hara as Terry
 James Fox as Alan
 Kate Ashfield as Madeline 
 Ralph Brown as Gordon Peters
 Denise Gough as Patsy

Production

Development
Director Nick Moran was linked to the project after being approached by development producer Mark Thomas who wrote the screenplay with Kevin Lewis. The two of them watched Moran's debut feature with executive producer Stephen May at Mayflower Studios. The film was called  Telstar: The Joe Meek Story.

The decision was made to tone down the level of abuse in the film. "You get the feeling of what goes on and your mind will come to its own conclusions", said Lewis.

Casting
In order to learn how to box, Rupert Friend was sent to train with former WBO World middleweight and super middleweight champion Steve Collins.

Moran explained that the make-up team had to make Natascha McElhone less attractive for the role; "Yes we put a lot of make-up on her to ugly her up a bit for the role, but it's not 'Planet of the Apes' type make-up, she still had to act underneath all that stuff and she was amazing and really breathed life into the character." Due to the accuracy of the make-up, Kevin Lewis had difficulty being on set because she looked so much like the real-life Gloria; "It was such a shock and I walked off the set when I heard her as Gloria shouting."

Augustus Prew was not at first meant to be the teenage Kevin Lewis. They were going for the other actor because he looked more like Rupert Friend. To look more like Rupert Friend, Augustus Says that he got his photographer friend to take pictures of him, with the same suit, same pose and blue contacts in his eyes. He then became Kevin Lewis. To become more like Kevin Lewis, he lost over a stone of weight, wore shoes 4 sizes too small and wore clothes that were too small. He was also always hungry during shooting to become the character, because the real Kevin Lewis told him that he  was always hungry and his muscles ached.

Filming
Various locations were scouted, including Lewis' home estate in New Addington, south of London, but it was ruled out due to the distance. The main locations were filmed on the South Oxhey council estate, on the borders of North London and Hertfordshire; however on the first day on set the filming was disrupted by the Criminal Investigation Department removing a dead body from the local woods.

Music
British singer/songwriter KT Tunstall wrote a song called "Boy" for the film.

Release
The film was affiliated on release with the British children's charity the National Society for the Prevention of Cruelty to Children, and the film's premiere was attended by the charity's ambassador Kylie Minogue.

Moran spoke of his hope that the film would result in a resurgence in this genre in the British film industry, "There's been a spate of rather silly British comedy films being made in the past few years and for a time that seemed to be the only type of film being made in this country so I hope 'The Kid' is a success and it opens the doors for more serious drama to be made in the UK."

References

External links
 
 

2010 films
2010 biographical drama films
2010s crime drama films
British biographical drama films
British crime drama films
British independent films
Child abuse in fiction
Child abuse in the United Kingdom
Films based on biographies
Films scored by Ilan Eshkeri
Films set in England
Films set in the 1980s
Films shot in England
2010 drama films
2010 independent films
2010s English-language films
Films directed by Nick Moran
2010s British films